The 1884 DePauw football team represented DePauw University during the 1884 college football season. The team lost the first game played in the state of Indiana to Butler by a score of 4–0.

Schedule

References

DePauw
DePauw Tigers football seasons
College football winless seasons
DePauw football